Jhander Kalan is a village in Shaheed Bhagat Singh Nagar district of Punjab State, India. Kalan is Persian language word which means Big and Khurd is Persian word which means small when two villages have same name then it is distinguished as Kalan means Big and Khurd means Small with Village Name. The village is administrated by Sarpanch an elected representative of the village.

Demography 
As of 2011, Jhander Kalan has a total number of 184 houses and population of 846 of which 432 include are males while 414 are females according to the report published by Census India in 2011. The literacy rate of Jhander Kalan is 85.49%, higher than the state average of 75.84%. The population of children under the age of 6 years is 74 which is 8.75% of total population of Jhander Kalan, and child sex ratio is approximately 1114 as compared to Punjab state average of 846.

Most of the people are from Schedule Caste which constitutes 49.05% of total population in Jhander Kalan. The town does not have any Schedule Tribe population so far.

As per the report published by Census India in 2011, 276 people were engaged in work activities out of the total population of Jhander Kalan which includes 257 males and 19 females. According to census survey report 2011, 98.91% workers describe their work as main work and 1.09% workers are involved in Marginal activity providing livelihood for less than 6 months.

Education 
The village has a Punjabi medium, co-ed upper primary with secondary school founded in 1967. The schools provide mid-day meal as per Indian Midday Meal Scheme and the meal prepared in school premises. As per Right of Children to Free and Compulsory Education Act the school provide free education to children between the ages of 6 and 14.

Amardeep Singh Shergill Memorial college Mukandpur and Sikh National College Banga are the nearest colleges.

List of schools nearby:
Sat Modern Public School, Mangat Dingrian
Guru Teg Bahadur Model School, Behram
Guru Ram Dass Public School, Cheta
Lovely Public School, Pathlawa

Transport 

See also 
List of villages in India

References

External links 
 Tourism of Punjab
 Census of Punjab
 Locality Based PINCode

Villages in Shaheed Bhagat Singh Nagar district